Goliath is a superhero comic book identity in Marvel Comics.

Character history
The Goliath identity has been used by various superheroes:

Henry Pym

Henry "Hank" Pym was the first to adopt the Goliath name.

Clint Barton

Clinton "Clint" Barton is better known as the superhero Hawkeye; he used the Pym size-changing gas to adopt the Goliath powers and identity shortly after Hank Pym was Yellowjacket. He remained Goliath through the Kree-Skrull War, and briefly resumed using the identity during "Operation: Galactic Storm".

Bill Foster

Dr. William "Bill" Foster was Pym's lab assistant who had an equally brief career as the Black Goliath and Giant-Man before retiring from superheroics. He later came out of retirement, donning a new costume and known as simply Goliath. In the "Civil War" storyline, he sided with Captain America's faction of outlaw Anti-Registration heroes, and was killed by a cyborg clone of Thor.

Erik Josten

Erik Josten was originally known as the supervillain Power Man. After being soundly defeated by Luke Cage – who was also calling himself Power Man at the time – he changed his codename to the Smuggler and later to Goliath. He adopted the superheroic identity Atlas upon joining the Thunderbolts.

Tom Foster
Tom Foster is Bill Foster's nephew. Created by Reginald Hudlin, Greg Pak and Koi Turnbull, he first appears in Black Panther vol. 4 #23 (Feb. 2007), and in World War Hulk: Aftersmash #1 (March 2008) as the new Goliath. According to Pak, Tom's character was created when Pak and Hudlin had wanted to use Bill's character but were unable to due to the man's demise in the Civil War story arc.

After learning of Bill's death from Black Panther, Tom swore to continue his uncle's legacy by replicating the Pym Particles that gave him his powers. To this end, T'Challa swore to assist him in any way possible, once Tom finished his M.I.T. studies.

Tom next appears during the Hulk's invasion of Manhattan, one of a group of the Hulk's supporters who stay in New York despite the government evacuation. He delivers a speech in which he criticizes Reed Richards and Tony Stark for creating Thor's clone that killed his uncle, declaring himself 'ready for the Hulk's justice'.

After the Hulk and Warbound are defeated and removed from Manhattan, Tom sneaks into the Avengers Mansion's abandoned labs, locating a vial of Pym Particles, which he uses to gain superpowers as Goliath. Upon doing so, he finds and assaults Iron Man in retaliation for his uncle's death, but is interrupted by an internal struggle between the captured Warbound and does not continue the attack. He then assists Damage Control in repairing the city.

Goliath later joins a team of anti-heroes assembled by Wonder Man (whose judgement was impaired at the time) to defeat the Avengers. He and the group are defeated by the Avengers and remanded to the Raft. During his interrogation, he states that he still blames Iron Man for his uncle's death.

During the "Civil War II" storyline, Goliath is shown to be an inmate at the Cellar. Mad Thinker tries to recruit him during a massive prison break, but he declines. He later defeats the villains and saves several guards' lives. For his heroic actions, Goliath is released from the Cellar on parole.

References

Marvel Comics male superheroes
Set index articles on comics
Characters created by Jack Kirby
Characters created by Stan Lee
Fictional characters who can change size
Marvel Comics characters with superhuman strength
Marvel Comics giants